Thing a Week (sometimes as Thing-a-Week) is a series of studio albums released by rock musician Jonathan Coulton in 2006. He compiled these albums from his weekly podcast, where he challenged himself to write, record, and produce a new song within a week, every week, for an entire year. He had done this to prove to himself, and to fans, that he was capable of working with a deadline.

Thing a Week One

Thing a Week One is the first album of the series, and Jonathan Coulton's fourth studio album. It contains some of Coulton's earliest hit songs, including "Shop Vac" and a cover of Sir Mix-a-Lot's "Baby Got Back." This album also features "W's Duty," one of very few songs Coulton has written about a real life topic. The tenth Thing a Week, "When I'm 25 or 64", is missing from this album due to copyright restrictions (it is a mashup of The Beatles' "When I'm Sixty-Four " from Sgt. Pepper's Lonely Hearts Club Band and Chicago's "25 or 6 to 4" from Chicago). It may be freely downloaded from Coulton's website. As such, this is the only Thing a Week album without at least 13 tracks (compare Thing a Week Four, which has 14).

Track list

All tracks written and composed by Jonathan Coulton unless noted.

Thing a Week Two

Thing a Week Two is the second Thing a Week album, and the fifth studio album by Jonathan Coulton. It features some of Coulton's most popular songs, including "Re: Your Brains," which would later be featured in Valve's popular 2009 video game, Left 4 Dead 2, and later re-recorded in French language in the album The Aftermath. "Chiron Beta Prime," a Christmas song that originated as a Christmas card to one of Coulton's friends, is also on the album and shows how Coulton's songs tend to be about science fiction. It also includes "I Will," a cover of The Beatles' song from the White Album.

Track List

All tracks written and composed by Jonathan Coulton unless noted.

Thing a Week Three

Thing a Week Three is the third Thing a Week album, and the sixth studio album by Jonathan Coulton. It contains two of Coulton's most popular songs. "Code Monkey," used as the theme to a TV show and internet series, G4's Code Monkeys, and "Tom Cruise Crazy", a song about Tom Cruise. "Code Monkey" was likely inspired by Coulton's days at the New York software company Cluen.

Track list

All tracks written and composed by Jonathan Coulton unless noted.

Thing a Week Four

Thing a Week Four is the fourth and final Thing a Week album, and the seventh studio album by Jonathan Coulton. It has some more of his popular songs, including "Creepy Doll", a song where a man buys an abandoned house and finds a living, creepy doll upstairs, and later is killed by the doll in a fire. (This song inspired a Magic: The Gathering card of the same name). "Mr. Fancy Pants", a song where a man is obsessed with his pants, urging another man to buy the world's best pants to best 'Mr. Fancy Pants' in a contest of whose pants are better. "You Ruined Everything", seemingly a parody of typical love songs by taking the tone of a love song with lyrics reflecting anger, sadness, or regret towards somebody. It is actually about Coulton's daughter, as he was inspired to write it because of her. "I'm Your Moon", a song about the moon, Charon, of Pluto. Coulton criticizes Earth scientists for renaming Pluto from a planet to a dwarf planet, and Coulton has been known to introduce the song by casually damning the scientists who made that decision. It also features covers of two Queen songs, "We Will Rock You", and "We Are The Champions".

Track list

All tracks written and composed by Jonathan Coulton unless noted.

References

2006 albums
Jonathan Coulton albums